The Escala i Corda XVII Professional League 07-08 of the Circuit Bancaixa is the top-level championship of the Escala i corda, a modality of Valencian pilota, organized by the firm ValNet. During the very first days the Valencian Pilota Federation disagreed with the way it was organized and gave no "official" title to this season, but finally ValNet and the FPV reached an agreement.

It is played in several rounds. The first two ones are a league all-against all; the two worst teams are disqualified. Every victory is worth 3 points, but if the losing team attains 50 jocs they sum up 1 point. This way, in the first round there are eight teams, in the second round there are six teams, and four in the semi-finals. The finals are played to the best of 3 matches.

Teams 
 Alcàsser:
 Víctor, Jesús and Oñate
 Benidorm:
 Genovés II, Sarasol II and Héctor
 Aquagest - L'Eliana:
 Álvaro, Solaz and Espínola
 Pedreguer:
 León, Fèlix and Salva
 Edicima - Petrer
 Miguel, Grau and Raül II
 Sagunt
 Pedro, Dani and Herrera
 València:
Núñez, Melchor and Tino
 Vila-real:
 Mezquita, Tato and Canari

Feridors 
 Miguelín, Oltra and Pedrito.

Replacing players 
 Escalaters:
 Adrián I, Colau and Primi.
 Mitgers
 Javi, Pere and Santi.
 Punters:
 Aucejo, Nacho and Tomàs II.

Scores

1st Round

1st Round classification

Notes to the 1st Round 
 On November 22 Espínola gets a finger broken and is replaced by Nacho for the 1st Round.
 On November 24 Núñez is replaced by Colau.

2nd Round

2nd Round classification

Eliminatories

Finals

Honor gallery

Other seasons 
 Circuit Bancaixa 04/05
 Circuit Bancaixa 05/06
 Circuit Bancaixa 06/07

References

External links 
 Official webpage
 Pilotavalenciana.es webpage

Valencian pilota competitions
Valencian pilota professional leagues